Estradiol benzoate/progesterone/methandriol dipropionate (EB/P4/MADP), sold under the brand name Progestandron (Organon), is an injectable combination medication of estradiol benzoate (EB), an estrogen, progesterone (P4), a progestogen, and methandriol dipropionate (MADP), an androgen/anabolic steroid. It contained 3 mg EB, 20 mg P4, and 50 mg MADP, was provided in the form of ampoules, and was administered by intramuscular injection. The medication was marketed by 1957. It is no longer available.

See also
 List of combined sex-hormonal preparations § Estrogens, progestogens, and androgens

References

Abandoned drugs
Combined estrogen–progestogen–androgen formulations